Vietnamese lotus tea (or ) is a type of green tea produced in Vietnam that has been flavored with the scent of Nelumbo nucifera. It is a specialty product of the Vietnamese tea industry and is consumed as part of celebratory events or festivals.

Production
The tea is made by allowing the green tea to absorb the flower's natural scent. This is done through several methods, either by:
Stuffing green tea leaves into a flower and leaving them overnight
Pulling the entire stamen from the flower or just their anthers and then either
Jar them overnight with the tea leaves with them
Bake the tea leaves with them
These steps can be repeated multiple times to increase the floral scent in the tea leaves. In the case of higher quality teas, one thousand lotus flowers per kilogram of tea are needed to complete this ancient process. Many modern production tend towards flavoring or perfumes to scent the tea.

Brewing
Lotus teas are typically very potent and are best brewed for under 2 minutes using cooler brewing temperatures (160 °F/70 °C). Some fancier ones will brew 3-4 times from one set of leaves.

References

Green tea
Blended tea
Lotus